Ceratocystis polyconidia is a plant-pathogenic saprobic fungal species first found in Africa, infecting Acacia mearnsii and Eucalyptus species.

References

Further reading
Simpson, Melissa C., et al. "Analysis of microsatellite markers in the genome of the plant pathogen Ceratocystis fimbriata." Fungal biology 117.7 (2013): 545–555.
De Beer, Z. W., et al. "Redefining Ceratocystis and allied genera." Studies in Mycology 79 (2014): 187–219.
Roux, J., and M. J. Wingfield. "Ceratocystis species: emerging pathogens of non-native plantation Eucalyptus and Acacia species." Southern Forests: a Journal of Forest Science 71.2 (2009): 115–120.

External links
 MycoBank

Fungal plant pathogens and diseases
Microascales
Fungi described in 2009